Jarosław Musiał (1962 – 2021) was a Polish illustrator and comic book artist.

From the 1980s onwards he cooperated with the Nowa Fantastyka magazine and was the chief artist of Magia i Miecz. He also cooperated with the Fenix magazine.  He illustrated fantasy and science fiction books by Feliks W. Kres, Marek S. Huberath, Jacek Piekara, Jacek Komuda, Konrad T. Lewandowski and others, as well as role-playing games such as Kryształy Czasu, Oko Yrrhedesa, Dzikie Pola, Wiedźmin: Gra wyobraźni.

References

Polish speculative fiction artists
Fantasy artists
Science fiction artists
21st-century Polish male artists
1962 births
2021 deaths
Role-playing game artists
Polish comics artists